Atherton may refer to:

Places

Australia 
 Atherton, Queensland, a town on the Atherton Tablelands of Far North Queensland
 Atherton Tableland, a fertile plateau in Queensland
 Shire of Atherton, a former local government area of Queensland on the Atherton Tableland
 Atherton Courthouse
 Atherton Performing Arts Theatre, former military depot and now theatre
 Atherton War Cemetery, built in 1942
 Atherton War Memorial, memorial at Kennedy Highway

Canada 
 Atherton, Ontario, a hamlet in Norfolk County, Ontario
 Mount Atherton, a mountain in Yukon

Malaysia
 Ladang Atherton, part of the electoral district N.31 Bagan Pinang, Port Dickson

United Kingdom 
 Atherton, Greater Manchester, town in Wigan district, historically in Lancashire, England
 Atherton (ward), electoral ward
 Atherton Hall, Leigh, country house and estate
 Atherton Urban District, local government district from 1863 until 1974
Atherton High School, Greater Manchester, mixed secondary free school
 Atherton Line, section of the Manchester-Southport Line, between Wigan and Salford
 Atherton railway station
 Atherton Bag Lane railway station, a former station

United States

California
 Atherton, California, a town in San Mateo County in the San Francisco Bay Area
 Atherton station, a station on the Caltrain railway line in this town
 Atherton House, also known as the Faxon Atherton Mansion, a historic building in San Francisco, California
 Menlo-Atherton High School, a four-year public comprehensive secondary school

Indiana
 Atherton, Indiana, an unincorporated community in Vigo County
 West Atherton, Indiana
 Atherton Building, Butler University

Hawaii
 Atherton Field, home of the Hawaii Pacific Sharks

Kentucky
 Athertonville, Kentucky, former home of Atherton pre-prohibition whiskey
 Atherton High School, Louisville, public school in Louisville, Kentucky

Massachusetts
 Atherton Bridge, a historic iron truss bridge in Lancaster, Massachusetts, spanning the South Branch of the Nashua River

Missouri
 Atherton, Missouri, an unincorporated community in Jackson County

Michigan
 Atherton Community Schools, a school district in the city of Burton, Michigan
 Atherton Settlement, within the city of Burton, Michigan

North Carolina
 Atherton Mill station,  a station on the Charlotte Trolley line in the South End of Charlotte, NC

Oklahoma
 The Atherton Hotel, within Oklahoma State University campus

Pennsylvania
 Atherton Hall (Penn State), a Pennsylvania State University dormitory

Vermont
 Atherton Farmstead, a historic farm property in Cavendish, Vermont

Elsewhere 
 Atherton Islands, off Antarctica
 Atherton Peak, South Georgia

People 
 Atherton (surname), includes a list of notable people with the surname
Atherton Blight (1834–1909), American lawyer, diarist, and philanthropist who traveled extensively in the middle of the 19th century to Europe and the Middle East
Atherton D. Converse, American politician
Atherton Curtis (1863–1843), American art collector and art historian who lived in France
Atherton Martín, Dominican agronomist and environmentalist
Atherton Rawstorne (1855–1936), British Bishop of Whalley
Atherton Seidell (1878–1961), American chemist and library scientist
Atherton Thayer, sheriff of Norfolk County, Massachusetts from 1794 to 1798

Science
 Atherton–Todd reaction, in organic chemistry
 Jiles–Atherton model, magnetic hysteresis model

Organisms
 Atherton antechinus (Antechinus godmani), also known as Godman's antechinus, a species of small carnivorous marsupial native to Australia
 Atherton delma (Delma mitella), a species of lizard in the family Pygopodidae endemic to Australia
 Atherton oak, the common name of the tall Australian tree Athertonia diversifolia
Athertonia, the monotypic genus of the Atherton oak, from the family
 Rubus probus or Atherton raspberry, a wild tropical raspberry species native to Papua New Guinea and parts of Australia
 Atherton sauropus (Sauropus macranthus), a rainforest tree from Asia, Melanesia and north-east Queensland
 Atherton scrubwren (Sericornis keri), an Australian bird species

Sports
 Atherton F.C., a former English association football team based in Atherton, Greater Manchester
 Atherton Laburnum Rovers F.C., an English association football team based in Atherton, Greater Manchester.
 Atherton Collieries A.F.C., an English association football team based in Atherton, Greater Manchester.
 Atherton Roosters, a Cairns, Queensland Rugby team

Other uses
 Atherton: The House of Power, a book by Patrick Carman
 USS Atherton, a 1943 World War II Cannon class destroyer escort